Maar Hattat  is a Syrian village located in Hish Nahiyah in Maarrat al-Nu'man District, Idlib.  According to the Syria Central Bureau of Statistics (CBS), Maar Hattat had a population of 798 in the 2004 census.

References 

Populated places in Maarat al-Numan District